Williamston High School was a public high school located in Williamston, North Carolina. It was one of four high schools in Martin County Schools and closed circa 2010. Students formerly served by this school are now served by Riverside High School.

References

Defunct schools in North Carolina
Schools in Martin County, North Carolina
2010 disestablishments in North Carolina
Educational institutions disestablished in 2010